Bryan Kent Anderson (July 5, 1942 – September 4, 2020) was a Canadian politician in Edmonton, Alberta, Canada. He was first elected to the Edmonton City Council in 1998 representing Ward 5. He was re-elected in 2001, 2004, and 2007. In 2010 the wards were renumbered, and Anderson was re-elected to the new Ward 9 in 2010 and 2013.

Before entering politics Anderson was a high school football and basketball coach for 34 years. As head coach, Anderson brought his teams to 38 city finals and won about 20 championships. He was inducted into the Alberta Schools' Athletics Association hall of fame in April 2010 in honor of his high school coaching career.

As a city councillor Anderson pushed for the building of recreation centres, arenas, and other sports facilities to encourage a more active and healthy lifestyle for Edmonton residents.  Not everyone agreed with Bryan Anderson's strong approach and promotion of city-use chemicals to control a wide-spread dandelion seed problem in Edmonton, a plant that later became protected from city spraying.

Anderson died in the morning of September 4, 2020 at the age of 78.

References

External links 
Bryan Anderson's Official Website

1942 births
2020 deaths
Canadian schoolteachers
Edmonton city councillors
University of Saskatchewan alumni